WMRP may refer to:

 WMRP-LP, a radio station in Mundy Township, Michigan with a country music format
 WWCK-FM, an AM radio station in Flint, Michigan that held the WMRP call letters from 1964 until 1971.
 WWCK (AM), an AM radio station in Flint, Michigan that held the WMRP call letters from 1946 until 1971.